The 2018–19 Israeli Basketball National League (or the Liga Leumit) is the 19th season of the Israeli Basketball National League. It started on October 31, 2018 with the first round of the regular season and ended on May 24, 2019 with the finals. Maccabi Haifa have won the championship after defeating Hapoel Galil Elyon 3–1 in a best of five series.

Teams
The following teams had changed divisions after the 2017–18 season:

Relegated from Premier League
Maccabi Haifa

Promoted from Liga Artzit
Elitzur Netanya
Elitzur Eito Ashkelon

Venues and locations

League table

Regular season

Playouts

Playoffs

Statistical leaders

|  style="width:50%; vertical-align:top;"|

Assists

|}
|}

|  style="width:50%; vertical-align:top;"|

Efficiency

|}
|}

Other statistics

Source: ibasketball.co.il

Awards

Finals MVP

Source: @LeumitBBall

Regular Season Best Import

Source: @LeumitBBall

Most Improved Player

Source: @LeumitBBall

Rising Star

Source: @LeumitBBall

Coach of the Year

Source: @LeumitBBall

All-League First Team

Source: @LeumitBBall

See also
2018–19 Israeli Basketball Premier League
2018–19 Israeli Basketball State Cup

References

Israeli
Basketball